Zawistowski (feminine: Zawistowska; plural: Zawistowscy) is a Polish surname. Notable people with the surname include:

 Antoni Zawistowski (1882–1942), Polish priest
 Daria Zawistowska (born 1995), Polish handball player
 Joseph Zawistowski (1918–2001), American bishop
 Kazimiera Zawistowska (1870–1902), Polish poet
 Paweł Zawistowski (born 1984), Polish footballer
 Sophie Zawistowska, 1979 novel Sophie's Choice and 1982 film character
 Tadeusz Józef Zawistowski (1930–2015), Polish bishop
 Tami Zawistowski, American politician
 Weronika Zawistowska (born 1999), Polish footballer

See also
 
 

Polish-language surnames